Grus can refer to

 Grus (genus), a genus of birds in the crane family
 Grus grus, the common crane
 Grus (constellation), the constellation "Crane"
 Grus (geology), an accumulation of angular, coarse-grained fragments (particles of sand and gravel) resulting from the granular disintegration of crystalline rocks

See also 
 Gruss (disambiguation)
 GRU (disambiguation)